American Portraits is an anthology radio program which aired on NBC from 1938 to 1951.

Premiering February 5, 1938, with the life of Andrew Jackson, the show featured dramatic biographical profiles of such famed figures as Walt Whitman (February 25, 1938), Mark Twain (on April 23, 1938), Benjamin Franklin, Thomas Jefferson, Abraham Lincoln and Harriet Beecher Stowe. Graham McNamee narrated, Raymond Scudder scripted and Joseph Hauntie was the music conductor.

One episode covered the life of Louis Agassiz, the Swiss-born naturalist, physician and professor who studied glaciers, birds and animals and founded a museum of natural history. A West Point anniversary program was presented March 19, 1938. "Harriet Beecher Stowe" dramatized the life of the author of Uncle Tom's Cabin.

Listen to

Radio Nostalgia Network: American Portraits: "The Incomparable Doctor, Benjamin Franklin"

American radio dramas
1930s American radio programs
1938 radio programme debuts
1951 radio programme endings
1940s American radio programs
1950s American radio programs
NBC radio programs